Nikita Dmitriyevich Yurkov (born 4 May 1995) is a Russian football player. He plays for FC Vityaz Podolsk.

Club career
He made his professional debut in the Russian Professional Football League for FC Metallurg Vyksa on 22 August 2014 in a game against FC Avangard Kursk.

He made his Russian Football National League debut for FC Volga Nizhny Novgorod on 5 April 2015 in a game against PFC Krylia Sovetov Samara.

References

External links
 
 Career summary by sportbox.ru

1995 births
Living people
Russian footballers
Association football midfielders
FC Volga Nizhny Novgorod players
FC Saturn Ramenskoye players
FC Vityaz Podolsk players